Sarabandus is a genus of marsh beetles in the family Scirtidae. There are at least two described species in Sarabandus.

Species
These two species belong to the genus Sarabandus:
 Sarabandus monticola Nakane, 1963
 Sarabandus robustus (LeConte, 1875)

References

Further reading

 

Scirtoidea
Articles created by Qbugbot